Jaja (also Romanized as Jājā and Jā Jā; also known as Chah Jā, Chāhjah, Chāhjeh, Chājeh, and Shāhjūn) is a village in Rezvaniyeh Rural District, in the Central District of Tiran and Karvan County, Isfahan Province, Iran. At the 2006 census, its population was 289 in 88 families.

References 

Populated places in Tiran and Karvan County